The Sheffield Bladerunners are a baseball club based in Sheffield, England who currently compete with 4 teams in the Single-A and Double-A Divisions of the Northern Baseball League of the British Baseball League  The Bladerunners were established in 1985 and their home ground is Forge Valley School, Sheffield.

In 2021, due to increased interest in their squad, the Bladerunners announce that they would enter the Northern Baseball League with 4 teams.

The Franchise also includes an Under-14 Junior Programme. Partnered with Arches School, the club has started an indoor training session for young aspiring baseball players.

Franchise history

Formation and Early History (1985–2000) 

Founded in 1985, the Bladerunners, led by manager Steve Herbert (who would soon be the BBF president), played their home games at Rowlinson Sports Centre, hosting mainly Yorkshire teams such as the Leeds City Royals, the Huddersfield Heroes and the Harrogate Redwings. Their games were all recorded in the popular Sheffield newspaper Green Un.

Over the next 15 years, many changes happened in the club, including changes in location and players. During the 1990s, many big names in Northern baseball would join the Bladerunners, such as Frazer Longford (who would go on to have his number retired), Tommy Booth, and current-day manager Rich Green. The league continued to be full of Northern teams, even reaching as high as Edinburgh in the late 1990s. In 1995, when the Bladerunners were playing in the British Baseball Federation North Division 2, Steve Herbert decided to leave the managing side of the club and allowed Lee Vaughn and Frazer Longford to take over as a managing duo.

In 1998, Hinde House School underwent a major refit and left the team looking for a new field to call home. At around the same time, Jay ‘Flanders’ Stearns joined the club (another player who would have his number retired). Appointed as manager in the 1998 preseason, the first job was to secure a new ground. After evaluating many options the Bladerunners finally settled at Myrtle Springs School. 1998 was also the debut year of 'Beaver Bites', a club newsletter made by the Sheffield Bladerunners.

Early 2000s Changes (2000–2005) 

In the early 2000s, the team moved to the Phoenix Sports Club, the ground that the team would reside in for a number of years. This occurred around the time of the league's restructuring in 2000, splitting teams based on quality and location: placing the Bladerunners with Manchester B, Durham, Barnsley and the Yorkshire Puddings.

The 2004 season, remains to this day, the best performance by the Bladerunners, where they dominated the 8-team Division 1 North, winning every single game. Their 21–0 record carried them into the postseason, where they won the championship. 2005 brought Nick Wills to the team, an American who would soon be the manager.

Barnsley Strikers Acquisition and Merger (2006–2011) 
In the 2006 offseason, the Sheffield Bladerunners merged with the Barnsley Strikers to form two teams, the Sheffield Bladerunners (AAA North) and the Sheffield Strikers (AA North). Following the merger, the 2007 season was a rebuilding year for both the Bladerunners and the Strikers. With the retirement of many veterans, the Strikers team became more of a youth side, completed by a few of the remaining ex-Barnsley players.

The Strikers struggled in the 2007 season, ending with a 1–18 record, and rejoined the Bladerunners, who in the 2008 season finished 5th in the league with a poor 6–18 record. The 2010 and 2011 seasons went far better for the Bladerunners however; in the latter, the team placed 2nd in the division with a record of 13–9, making the playoffs for the second straight season.

Stearns' Departure and Rebuilding (2012–2014) 
In 2012, big changes happened to the club: Jay Stearns resigned as manager, and another ground change occurred, this time to Thorncliffe, which did not have a developed diamond, let alone a mound. Up until 2018, the Bladerunners have used a portable mound built by Stearns prior to his departure. Nick Wills took over as manager from Stearns and would remain in this position until Rich Green took over in 2016.

The 2014 season marked a period of growth and expansion for the Bladerunners, as the pre-season brought a substantial number of new players, both rookies and returning players. This season also featured an overhaul of the team's management and structure, with the introduction of new coaches, a media officer and a social events officer.

Modern Day Bladerunners (2015–present) 
In 2015, the team relocated once again to their current home: Forge Valley School, which boasts fantastic facilities and a baseball mound built by the team in 2018.

Following the split of Northern teams from the British Baseball Federation, the Bladerunners joined the newly formed British Baseball League's Northern Baseball League. They currently play in the BBL's Northern Baseball League under manager Rich Green.

2017 saw the launch of the Bladerunners Junior Programme, a youth system for Under-14s to get involved with baseball.

In 2019, the Bladerunners club were able to confirm that due to a growing player-base, there would be a second-team added to the Single-A division. These teams were split between veterans and rookies to help with development, and in the first season of this new change, Bladerunners I was able to secure a division title. Bladerunners II also made the playoffs. The plan had paid off and the team saw success on and off the diamond.

For the 2020 season, the club added a third team, and due to the reworked Northern Baseball League, the Single-A division was split into East, Central, and West. Therefore with the splits taking place, the three Bladerunners teams were due to fill out the Central division. However, due to the COVID-19 pandemic, the 2020 season of the National Baseball League did not go ahead.

For the 2021 season of the Northern Baseball League, the club announced the intention to offer 4 teams into the Double-A and Single-A divisions. </ref>

The 2021 season, which would be the first full season since the 2020 season was cancelled due to the covid-19 pandemic, proved to be a strong season for the Bladerunners.

The Bladerunners, now expanded to four teams with a large number of rookies performed well under their respective managers, Stephanie Osman and Paul Cassidy the experienced Great Britain softball players led team II. team III was led by Infielder and captain Jack Hukin and Pitcher/3rd Baseman Alan Bowers a Barnsley duo who brought a hard working attitude. and team IV was led by the extremely experienced outfielder Jon Briscoe and peerless defensive catcher and lefty batter Martin Hingley.

Team I was led by Nestor Martinez who proved to be a rock for team I, he pitched regularly and played his usual shortstop position with excellence and with some added power hitting.

Team II, III and IV played in the A division whilst team I played in the AA division.

Team I and IV ultimately qualified for the AA and A playoffs respectively with Team I eventually falling to the Newcastle Nighthawks in a hard fought game eventually losing out 12-1.

Team IV however defeated rivals Sheffield Bruins development team the Cubs decisively to set up a final with the Halton Trojans a team within the Liverpool Trojans organisation and defeated them comfortably to claim the A playoff championship.

This victory will allow them to compete in the national A championship scheduled in late September, Team IB will be playing as the representative of the British Baseball League at the A level.

Going forward the bladerunners are hoping to repeat and build on the success in both A and AA in the 2022 season.

Season Records

Current roster (as of 2022)

Retired Numbers 
23 Frazer Longford (Manager; 1995–1998) 

28 Jay 'Flanders' Stearns (Manager; 1998–2012)

See also

Baseball
Baseball in the United Kingdom

References

External links

Baseball teams in England
Baseball teams in the United Kingdom